Açma is a village in the Gerger District, Adıyaman Province, Turkey.  The village is populated by Kurds of the Culur tribe and had a population of 171 in 2021.

The hamlets of Çukurca and Yuvacık are attached to the village.

References

Villages in Gerger District
Kurdish settlements in Adıyaman Province